George M. Robinson was an American from Salem, Wisconsin, who served a single one-year term in 1850 as a Free Soil Party member of the Wisconsin State Assembly from southern Racine County, succeeding fellow Free Soiler Herman Thorp.

In 1850, Kenosha County was created from the southern half of Racine County.  Robinson's Assembly district, previously covering southwest Racine County, was now the western Assembly district of Kenosha County.  At Kenosha county's first elections in April 1850, Robinson was elected the first County Treasurer. He was ultimately succeeded in the Assembly by Obed Hale, another Free Soiler.

References 

Members of the Wisconsin State Assembly
People from Racine County, Wisconsin
Wisconsin Free Soilers
19th-century American politicians
Year of birth missing
Place of birth missing
People from Salem Lakes, Wisconsin
Year of death missing